Tarik Cerić (born 28 January 1978) is a retired Bosnian footballer who played as a defender.

External links
 
 sportin.ba

1978 births
Living people
Footballers from Sarajevo
Association football defenders
Bosnia and Herzegovina footballers
FK Olimpik players
NK SAŠK Napredak players
FK Sarajevo players
HŠK Posušje players
ŁKS Łódź players
HNK Rijeka players
HNK Šibenik players
FK Velež Mostar players
Premier League of Bosnia and Herzegovina players
First League of the Federation of Bosnia and Herzegovina players
Ekstraklasa players
Croatian Football League players
Bosnia and Herzegovina expatriate footballers
Expatriate footballers in Poland
Bosnia and Herzegovina expatriate sportspeople in Poland
Expatriate footballers in Croatia
Bosnia and Herzegovina expatriate sportspeople in Croatia